Katun Nature Reserve (also Katunsky) is a Russian zapovednik (strict nature reserve) located in the highlands of the central Altai Mountains of south Siberia. The Katun River runs down through a valley in the reserve, serving as the primary source of the Ob River. Katun is an internationally important center of biodiversity, forming part of the "Golden Mountains of Altai" UNESCO World Heritage Site. Katun Nature Reserve is situated in the Ust-Koksinsky District of Altai Republic.

Topography
The topography of the reserve includes glaciers, alpine tundra, meadows, and forests. Much of the terrain has been formed through glaciation, and there are small lakes, streams, waterfalls, and steep slopes.

Ecoregion and climate
Katun is located in the Altai alpine meadow and tundra ecoregion (WWF ID #PA1001).  This ecoregion displays a complete sequence of altitudinal vegetation zones in central Siberia including steppe, forest-steppe, mixed forest, sub-alpine vegetation and alpine vegetation. The region is also an important habitat for endangered the snow leopard and its prey.

The Katun Reserve has an Alpine climate (Köppen climate classification (ET)).  This indicates a local climate in which at least one month has an average temperature high enough to melt snow (0 °C (32 °F)), but no month with an average temperature in excess of 10 °C (50 °F).

Flora and fauna
The reserve features 700 species of plants, 51 mammals, 140 of birds, three types of reptiles and eight fish species. Endangered species include the fawn lily (Erythronium sibericum), peony (Paeonia hybrida), spleenwort (Asplenium exiguum), and, rarely, the snow leopard (Uncia uncia).

Ecotourism
As a strict nature reserve, the Katun Reserve is mostly closed to the general public, although scientists and those with "environmental education" purposes can make arrangements with park management for visits. There are "ecotourist" routes in the reserve, however, that are open to the public, but require permits to be obtained in advance.  The main office is in the town of Ust'-Koksa.  Reserve rangers lead ecotourist hikes to Upper Lake Multinskiye, with groups assembling at 11:00 daily in season (July–September).  There are other ecoroutes, requiring guides, to the headwaters of the Katun River.

See also
 List of Russian Nature Reserves (class 1a "zapovedniks")

References

External links 

 Map of the Boundaries of Katun Reserve
  Entry for Katun, UNESCO-MAB Biosphere Reserve Directory

Geography of the Altai Republic
Nature reserves in Russia
Biosphere reserves of Russia
World Heritage Sites in Russia
Altai Mountains
Protected areas established in 1991
1991 establishments in Russia
Zapovednik